Verrières is a commune in the Aveyron department in southern France.

Population

Geography
Nearby is the Verrières Viaduct on the A75 autoroute.

See also
Communes of the Aveyron department

References

Communes of Aveyron
Aveyron communes articles needing translation from French Wikipedia